Wayne Ferreira was the defending champion, but lost in the second round to Ronald Agénor.

Qualifier Yahiya Doumbia won the title by defeating Jakob Hlasek 6–4, 6–4 in the final. Doumbia became the first professional player ever to win two ATP tournaments as a qualifier, after also winning at Lyon in 1988.

Seeds

Draw

Finals

Top half

Bottom half

References

External links
 Official results archive (ATP)
 Official results archive (ITF)

Grand Prix Passing Shot
ATP Bordeaux
Grand Prix Passing Shot
Grand Prix Passing Shot